George Frideric Handel (1685–1759) was a German/British Baroque composer.

Handel may also refer to:

Places
 Handel Ice Piedmont, Alexander Island, Antarctica
 Handel, Saskatchewan, a village in Canada
 Handel, Netherlands, a village in Gemert-Bakel, the Netherlands
 3826 Handel, a small main-belt asteroid
 Handel (crater), a crater on Mercury

Business
 Handel Architects, a firm founded in New York in 1994
 Handel's Homemade Ice Cream & Yogurt, an ice cream parlor franchise
 Swedish Commercial Employees' Union or Handels

Other uses
 Handel (name)
 HANDEL, the UK's National Attack Warning System in the Cold War
 Handel Medallion, an award presented by the City of New York
 Handel Prize, an award presented by Halle, Germany
 Sir Handel, a character from Thomas the Tank Engine and Friends
 Pip, the protagonist of Dickens' novel Great Expectations, called "Handel" by another character

See also
 Ida Haendel (1928–2020), Polish-British violinist
 Handel-C, a programming language 
 Handle (disambiguation)
 Handler (disambiguation)
 Hendel
 Hendl